St Paul's Theological Centre (SPTC) is a British centre for theological learning, based at Holy Trinity Brompton (HTB) in South Kensington, London. It is led by its principal, the Reverend Russell Winfield.

SPTC runs a four-week Monday evening course, called School of Theology, for members of HTB and other churches. It also runs a monthly podcast called GodPod which has had over 1,000,000 downloads.

SPTC is a constituent member of St Mellitus College.

External links 
Official website

Buildings and structures of the Church of England
Bible colleges, seminaries and theological colleges in England
Anglican seminaries and theological colleges
Education in the Royal Borough of Kensington and Chelsea
South Kensington
Anglican buildings and structures in the United Kingdom